Trebizon is a series of school story novels by Anne Digby set in the fictional school of that name. The fourteen novels were published between 1978 and 1994. Like Enid Blyton's much earlier creation, Malory Towers, Trebizon is located in Cornwall.

The novels follow the protagonist Rebecca Mason from when she joins the school in the second form through to the end of her fifth year. A major theme throughout the series is Rebecca's burgeoning talent for tennis. Other major characters include Rebecca's two best friends, Tish Anderson and Susan Murdoch, and her boyfriend Robbie Anderson.

The series is now being reprinted by Egmont, with illustrations from Lucy Truman. The first seven books were published in 2016, with more to come in 2017.  Additionally, all fourteen titles are widely available as ebooks.

Series details

Characters
Rebecca Mason
Ishbel "Tish" Anderson
Mara Leonodis 
Susan Murdoch
Margot Lawrence 
Laura Wilkins 
Sally Elphinstone  
Lucy Hubbard
Robbie Anderson 
Margaret Exton 
Josselyn Vining
Roberta Jones
Cliff
Pippa Walkers
Mrs Barrington

External links
 Chapter 1 of Secret Letters at Trebizon

 Book Reviews from readers of First Term at Trebizon

Book series introduced in 1978
Series of children's books
Novel sequences
Novels set in Cornwall
British children's novels
Fictional schools
Novels set in schools